John Paul Jones is a 1959 biographical adventure film from Warner Bros. Pictures, filmed in the Technirama process, about the American Revolutionary War naval hero. The film, shot in Dénia, Spain, was produced by Samuel Bronston and directed by John Farrow, from a screenplay by John Farrow, Ben Hecht, and Jesse Lasky Jr. The film is based on the story Nor'wester by Clements Ripley. The music score was by Max Steiner and the cinematography was by Michel Kelber. It was the final film directed by Farrow.

The film stars Robert Stack (in the title role), Marisa Pavan, Charles Coburn, Macdonald Carey, Jean-Pierre Aumont, David Farrar, Peter Cushing, Basil Sydney, and Thomas Gomez. The director's daughter and son Mia Farrow and John Charles Farrow also make their feature film debuts. Bette Davis made a cameo appearance as Empress Catherine the Great.

Plot
On screen narration opens with a United States Navy officer telling new midshipmen at the U.S. Naval Academy the story of John Paul Jones (played as an adult by Robert Stack).

In 1759, twelve-year old John Paul (John Charles Farrow) attacks an English officer trying to enforce English laws against bagpipe playing and wearing kilts, symbols of Scottish nationalism.  John Paul becomes an apprentice, serving on several ships, becoming an experienced navigator by age 17 and by 1773 becoming master of a ship in the British West Indies.  A fight with a mutinous crew member results in the mutineer's death, but because of the sailor's family connections, the governor of Tobago (Basil Sydney) advises Paul to leave and change his name.  Paul adds a new surname, becoming "John Paul Jones," and goes to visit a brother who lives in Fredericksburg, Virginia.

Jones' brother has recently died, and he learns that he is to inherit his brother's estate, which includes two enslaved children, named Scipio (Charles Wise) and Cato (Randolph McKenzie), who are about to sold in the slave market.  Jones, who in an earlier scene had expressed his hatred of the slave trade, frees the boys, who continue to work with him alongside his late brother's clerk, Peter Wooley (Tom Brannum).  Jones also retains the services of his brother's attorney, the rising politician Patrick Henry (Macdonald Carey), to assist in business matters. Jones and Henry share resentment of British rule in the American colonies, but Jones finds himself torn between their friendship and his interest in Henry's love interest, Dorothea Danders (Erin O'Brien).

His brother's will had required Jones to settle down as a farmer, which Jones tries to do with little success.  Having been rejected by Dorothea's father (Judson Laire) as a possible husband because of his questionable past, he decides to return to sea.  The American Revolution has begun, and Jones shows his daring and ingenuity in a surprise American attack on British forces in Nassau in the Bahamas despite his superiors' misgivings.  With the Declaration of Independence, Jones is given his own command in a barely-existent American Continental Navy and is reunited with Scipio and Cato, who then sail with him.  Jones is able to seize eighteen enemy ships, whose cargo includes clothing meant for British troops under General Burgoyne but is now sent to  American General George Washington (John Crawford).

Despite his successes, Jones is denied further command due to his low social and political status.  When Jones goes to Valley Forge to deliver his resignation, Washington points out the desperate circumstances of his troops and persuades the sailor to go to France to help Benjamin Franklin (Charles Coburn) in enlisting the French as allies. In France, Jones is celebrated for his heroic feats at sea. At Franklin's urging, Jones takes a Dutch frigate that had been captured by the French and conducts a series of raids on the British coast, capturing the town of Whitehaven and its arms but treating the townspeople well.  Once again, however, Jones' success is undercut by political rivalry, and his ship is taken from him.

Jones' new love interest, Aimee de Telleson (Marisa Pavan), is a lady in waiting to Marie Antoinette (Susana Canales) and, with Franklin's help, they persuade King Louis XVI (Jean-Pierre Aumont) to build a new ship for Jones, which will fly under the American flag with the name Bonhomme Richard (the French name for Franklin's "Poor Richard"). At sea, Jones engages in battle with the British ship HMS Serapis.  Though his ship is heavily damaged, Jones continues to fight on, telling British Captain Richard Pearson (Peter Cushing), "I have not yet begun to fight!"  Jones and his men overpower the British and seize control of the Serapis even while his own ship sinks.

Jones is unable to pursue his romance with Aimee because, again, of his social status.   With the end of the revolution, Jones' desire to be put in command of the American Navy is also thwarted by the lack of government funding, so he answers the call for his help from the Russian Empress Catherine the Great (Bette Davis). Surrounded by sycophantic nobles, Catherine tests Jones' resolve and finds him withstanding the temptations of court life.  She gives him command of the Black Sea Fleet, and Jones leads it to victory over the Ottomans during the Russo-Turkish War.  Given a title of nobility, Jones hopes to be able to return to France and Aimee.  Jones becomes seriously ill, but returns to Paris.  As he lies dying, Aimee writes down a letter he composes listing the qualities that a naval commander should have.

The final scene dissolves to the present day of 1959 and the Naval Academy.  The narrating officer concludes with remarks about Jones' legacy.

Cast

 Robert Stack as John Paul Jones
 Marisa Pavan as  Aimee de Tellison
 Charles Coburn as Benjamin Franklin
 Erin O'Brien as Dorothea Danders
 Macdonald Carey as Patrick Henry
 Judson Laire as Mr. Danders 
 Bette Davis as Empress Catherine the Great
 Jean-Pierre Aumont as  King Louis XVI
 David Farrar as John Wilkes
 Peter Cushing as Captain Pearson
 Susana Canales as Marie Antoinette
 Georges Rivière as Russian Chamberlain
 Tom Brannum as Peter Wooley
 Bruce Cabot as Gunner Lowrie
 Basil Sydney as Sir William Young
 John Crawford as George Washington
 Archie Duncan as Duncan MacBean
 Thomas Gomez as Esek Hopkins
 Bob Cunningham as Lt. Wallingford
 John Charles Farrow as John Paul
 Eric Pohlmann as King George III
 Frank Latimore as	Lt. Richard Dale
 Ford Rainey as Lt. Simpson

Production

Development
During the 1930s numerous American film studios attempted to make biopics about John Paul Jones, but abandoned their projects due to the heavy cost and long length of the projects. In March 1939, Warner Bros. Pictures had purchased the screen rights to Clements Ripley's biographical novel about John Paul Jones, which was titled Clear for Action. James Cagney was attached to portray the title role, with Michael Curtiz directing and William Cagney producing. Cagney was later replaced as producer with Lou Edelman.

In 1946, independent producer Samuel Bronston announced that he had obtained the cooperation of the U.S. Navy for the making of his own biopic of John Paul Jones. It took Bronston nine years to eventually find the financing for the project. In December 1955, Bronston announced that he had formed Admiralty Pictures Corporation, consisting of a group of New York investors, and that they had made a deal with Warner Bros. to produce their long dormant Call to Action project. Bronson hired Jesse Lasky, Jr. to writing the script and Bronston wanted John Wayne to star. Bronstein's studio received investment from numerous American entrepreneurs and corporations including the Rockefeller family, the Dana family, the Du Pont family, the Stern family, Ernest A. Gross, General Motors, Firestone Tire and Rubber Company, Time Inc., and Eastman Kodak so that they could retrieve funds frozen from sales in Europe. In January 1956, Bronston stated that Admiral Chester Nimitz would act as his personal adviser on the film, in which production was to begin in May of that year.

In 1956, Lasky completed the script with consultation from U.S. Navy officials. In May 1956, Bronston announced that Glenn Ford had accepted the title role. Later, in July, William Dieterle had signed to direct the project, in which filming was scheduled for August. Dieterle favored Richard Todd and Richard Basehart for the role of Jones and John Miljan for George Washington, and hired Ben Hecht to write a new version of the script. By September, Basehart had been cast after Bronston had tested 38 actors for the title role. The film would be shot in Warner Bros.' studio and off the Italian coast.

In October 1956, Bronston signed a contract to shoot the feature in the Todd-AO process. However, production was pushed back as Warner Bros. had withdrawn from the project. In October 1957, John Farrow had signed on to direct the film with shooting being re-located to Spain. Farrow liked Lasky's script but rewrote it himself since he was unavailable to collaborate on further edits. Farrow initially received sole credit for writing but ultimately shared it with Lasky after he complained to the Writers’ Guild of America. Two months later, it was reported that the Navy re-affirmed its full cooperation and that Warner Bros. had re-signed on as the distributor. In February 1958, Robert Stack would play the title role. The film was made in part using funds "frozen" in Spain.

Filming
Filming started January 1958 in France and ended in August in Spain. There were 107 speaking parts and a shooting schedule of 92 days. Most of the unit was based at Denia. The Spanish government allowed filming at the Royal Palace in Madrid. There were also scenes shot in Scotland and Ostia.

Reception
Bosley Crowther of The New York Times wrote the film was "an unexciting picture, so far as dramatic action is concerned, and utterly unexpressive of the recorded nature and character of John Paul Jones." He was dismissive of Stack's performance noting his portrayal was "as though he were a slightly dull but talkative member of a conservative gentleman's club". Variety was similarly critical, noting the film "could be shortened drastically and tightened to give it better pace and emphasis. The strong portions would then show to better advantage and eliminate the drag of unnecessary plotting." Also, the magazine felt the depicted historical figures "tended to be stiff or unbelievable" because the film "doesn't get much fire-power into the characters. They end, as they begin, as historical personages rather than human being." Harrison's Reports wrote the film "is excellent from the production point of view. It is, however, only moderately satisfying as an entertainment, for it is handicapped by a script that is something less than inspiring."

The film was a box office failure, losing $5 million. Bronston, however, managed to raise financing from many of the same investors, notably Pierre S. du Pont III, for his later features.

Legacy
Musician John Paul Jones (born John Baldwin), best known as the bassist of English rock band Led Zeppelin, took his stage name at the suggestion of Andrew Loog Oldham, who had seen the film's poster.

Despite the financial failure of John Paul Jones, Bronston continued to produce a number of historical epic films, in which he had established Spain as a major production center in filmmaking. However, Bronston would file for Chapter 11 bankruptcy in June 1964 following another financial failure with The Fall of the Roman Empire.

Comic book adaptation
 Dell Four Color #1007 (September 1959) The Dell comic was drawn by Dan Spiegle.

See also
 List of films about the American Revolution
 List of television series and miniseries about the American Revolution

References

Bibliography

External links
 
 
 
 

1959 films
1950s biographical drama films
Warner Bros. films
American biographical drama films
Spanish biographical drama films
Samuel Bronston Productions films
Films directed by John Farrow
Films scored by Max Steiner
American Revolutionary War films
Films set in 1759
Films set in 1773
Films set in the 1780s
Films set in the 1790s
Films set in Russia
Films set in France
Films set in England
Films set in Scotland
Films set in the United States
American epic films
Spanish epic films
Films shot in Madrid
Films adapted into comics
Cultural depictions of George Washington
Cultural depictions of Benjamin Franklin
Cultural depictions of Catherine the Great
Cultural depictions of George III
Cultural depictions of Marie Antoinette
Cultural depictions of Louis XVI
Cultural depictions of Patrick Henry
1959 drama films
Films set in Trinidad and Tobago
Films set in the British Empire
Films set in Virginia
Films shot in France
Films shot in Spain
Films shot in Italy
Films set in the Bahamas
Films set in Pennsylvania
1950s English-language films
1950s American films